State Route 360 (SR 360) is a north-south state highway in Monroe County, Tennessee. It serves to connect Vonore with Fort Loudoun State Park, Cherohala Skyway, and Tellico Plains.

Between Tellico Plains and Ballplay, SR 360 is known as Ballplay Road, and between Ballplay and Vonore, it is known as Unicoi Turnpike.

Route description

SR 360 begins in Tellico Plains at an intersection with SR 165 (Cherohala Skyway) just east of downtown. It immediately crosses a bridge over the Tellico River to leave Tellico Plains and wind its through mix of farmland and wooded areas as Ballplay Road. The highway then passes through a section of the Unicoi Mountains before passing through the community of Ballplay, where it makes a sharp right turn onto the Unicoi Turnpike. SR 360 continues to wind its way north through mountains to cross a section of Tellico Lake before turning northwest to pass through the community of Toqua and by various marinas along the banks of the lake. It then crosses a Causeway over the lake to pass along an island, where it passes by Fort Loudoun State Park and the Seqouyah Birthplace Museum. It then crosses another causeway and bridge over the lake to enter Vonore and travels not even a mile before coming to an end at an intersection with US 411/SR 72 (SR 33) in a business district in the eastern part of town. The entire route of SR 360 is a two-lane highway and between Tellico Plains and Toqua, it travels along the western edge of the Cherokee National Forest.

Major intersections

References

360
Transportation in Monroe County, Tennessee